Arenicolumba prattae  is an extinct species of small pigeon from the Miocene of Florida. It was described from fossil material ( a left coracoid) collected at the Thomas Farm Site in Gilchrist County, northern Florida, south-eastern United States. The genus name Arenicolumba comes from the Latin arena (“sandy place”) with reference to the sandy, fossiliferous sediments of the collection site, and columba (“pigeon”). Originally described in 1992 as Columbina prattae, it was moved to the new genus in 2008.

References

Fossil taxa described in 1992
Birds described in 1992
Columbidae
Miocene birds of North America
Native birds of the Southeastern United States